Velvety goldenrod or velvet goldenrod is a common name for several plants and may refer to:

Solidago mollis, native to central North America
Solidago velutina, native to western North America